Tessa Violet Williams, previously known as Meekakitty, is a singer-songwriter, video blogger, actress, music video director, and former model. Originally a vlogger, over the years Tessa Violet's online content became devoted to her musical career with Violet having released two studio albums, Maybe Trapped Mostly Troubled in 2014 and Bad Ideas in 2019.

Early life and career
Violet grew up in Ashland, Oregon and performed in theatre productions while in high school. She began her YouTube channel in July 2006 and started daily vlogging in 2007 for a school project under the username Meekakitty when working in Hong Kong and Thailand as a fashion model.

After moving to New York City in 2009, Violet gained attention after winning $100,000 in a YouTube competition by receiving the most comments on her video entry. In 2011, Violet was featured in fellow YouTube creator Nanalew's music video for the song "Sail" by Awolnation. The video went viral and has since amassed over 370 million views. On September 24, 2012, Violet appeared in the music video for Family Force 5's "Cray Button" ft. Lecrae

Music
Violet released her first album Maybe Trapped Mostly Troubled on March 18, 2014. The album was produced by Seth Earnest at Maker Studios, with John Zappin as A&R. Despite the lack of attention from traditional media sources, the record debuted at number 10 on the Billboard Heatseekers chart and sold 5,000 copies in the first three months.

Violet released the lead single "Dream" from her EP Halloway on September 16, 2016. The full EP was released October 14, 2016. She released videos for all songs on the project.

In 2018, Violet revealed she was working on her second album, Bad Ideas. "Crush," the first single from the record, was released June 15, 2018. An accompanying music video directed by Big Forest was released on YouTube on the same day. As of May 2021, the music video has reached over 82 million views on YouTube. The single led to Violet being featured on YouTube's Artist On The Rise. The entire album was set to release on August 3, 2018 before an alteration in the album's release plan. The album's title track, "Bad Ideas," was released as a single on November 30, 2018. "I Like (the idea of) You" came out in May 2019. She released Bad Ideas (Act One) in July 2019, featuring remixes of the first three singles of the project.

On October 25 2019, Violet released her second album Bad Ideas. The album contains 11 tracks, 4 of which have been released as singles (Crush, Bad Ideas, I Like (the idea of) You, and Games). The song was released via the label T∆G MUSIC. She promoted it with The Experience 

Violet was also featured on a remix of the I Dont Know How But They Found Me song "New Invention."
Tessa released Breakdown in 2022 to go alongside a tour 
She released Breakdown in 2022 

Violet cites artists such as Lorde, Bleachers, Lily Allen, Taylor Swift, Cavetown, and Julia Michaels among her influences.

Discography

Studio albums

Collaborative albums

Extended plays

Singles

As lead artist

As featured artist

Other appearances

Music videos

References

External links

21st-century American actresses
21st-century American comedians
21st-century American singers
21st-century American women singers
American bloggers
American child models
American comedy musicians
American women pop singers
American women singer-songwriters
American folk guitarists
American indie pop musicians
American music video directors
American women bloggers
American women comedians
American women guitarists
American YouTubers
Living people
Maker Studios people
Music YouTubers
YouTube channels launched in 2006
Patreon creators
People from Ashland, Oregon
Singers from Chicago
Singer-songwriters from Oregon
Women video bloggers
Singer-songwriters from Illinois
Year of birth missing (living people)